Rhaphicera satricus, the large tawny wall, is a species of satyrine butterfly found in western China, India (Simla and Sikkim) and Tibet.

References

Butterflies of Asia
Elymniini
Taxa named by Edward Doubleday
Butterflies described in 1849